

Otto Binge, (born 19 May 1895, died 18 July 1982) was an SS-Standartenführer during World War II and a commander of the SS Division Götz von Berlichingen and the SS Polizei Division.

References

1895 births
1982 deaths
SS-Standartenführer
Waffen-SS personnel
German Army personnel of World War I
People from Cottbus
Military personnel from Brandenburg